Union Township is a township in Johnson County, Iowa, USA.

History
Union Township was organized in 1854.

References

Townships in Johnson County, Iowa
Townships in Iowa
1854 establishments in Iowa